German Eurodance group Cascada has released six studio albums (including a Christmas and an acoustic album), four compilation albums, one remix album, 32 singles (including one as a featured artist), one promotional single and 25 music videos.

Cascada's debut album, Everytime We Touch, was released in February 2006 and spawned a chain of hit singles including the title track second single "Everytime We Touch". The album also includes the internationally successful "Miracle" and "Truly Madly Deeply". Their second album, Perfect Day was released in December 2007, which was commercially successful and produced the international single, "What Hurts the Most". This was followed by, Evacuate the Dancefloor, summer 2009 and the title track and first single, "Evacuate the Dancefloor", entered the UK Singles Chart at number one becoming Cascada's first number one in the UK. The following album, Original Me, became Cascada's lowest-charting album, but spawned moderately successful singles such as "Pyromania" and "San Francisco". They released a greatest-hits album after, including the singles "Summer of Love", "The Rhythm of the Night", "Glorious" which was used in the Eurovision Song Contest 2013, and "The World Is in My Hands". Additionally, the group has released non-album singles, including "Blink", "Madness", "Reason", "Run", "Playground", "Back for Good" and "Like The Way I Do".

Albums

Studio albums

Compilation albums

Remix albums

Acoustic albums

Holiday albums

Singles

As lead artist

As featured artist

Promotional singles

Other charted songs

Music videos

Notes

References

External links
 
 
 
 

Discography
Discographies of German artists
Electronic music discographies
Pop music group discographies